The New York City Gay Men's Chorus is a choral organization in New York City that has been presenting an annual concert season for more than four decades.

History
The New York City Gay Men's Chorus (NYCGMC) was founded in August 1980  by Ed Weaver who having moved to NYC had been  a member of the San Francisco Gay Men's Chorus. Their first season culminated in a sold-out concert with the Riverside Symphony at Alice Tully Hall in June 1981 which featured new pieces or newly arranged works by Leonard Bernstein, Jack Gottlieb, Calvin Hampton, John Mueter, Stephen Sondheim, and Glen Vecchione. Music critic Allen Hughes in his review in The New York Times wrote: "The chorus is less than a year old, having been organized last August, but there was nothing about it that suggested immaturity. Musicianship and diction were exemplary, the dark tuxedos worn by all singers made for neat appearance, and the entrances and exits had been planned to achieve optimum efficiency, dignity and style."

In 1982 the chorus became one of the founding members of the GALA Choruses along with The Stonewall Chorale, the Anna Crusis Women's Choir, the San Francisco Gay Men's Chorus and a handful of other choruses and the following year the chorus was host to the "first national gay choral festival" presented by GALA at Alice Tully Hall. In addition to the NYCGMC, the festival featured performances by gay choruses from Chicago, Denver, Los Angeles, Seattle, Washington, Madison, Wis., Anaheim, Calif., and New Orleans. The final performance included performances by New York's Stonewall Chorale and NYCGMC. Included on the NYCGMC performance was a commissioned work by composer John David Earnest, with the world premiere of "Only in the Dream." The festival concluded with the combined choruses and featured two world premieres: Libby Larsen's Everyone Sang and Ned Rorem's Whitman Cantata. In 1984 the chorus performed at the Eastern Division Conference of the American Choral Directors Association (ACDA). It was the first time that the ACDA had featured a gay chorus at one of its conventions.

In 1985 the NYCGMC participated in a high-profile AIDS Benefit, The Best of the Best: A Show of Concern,  at the Metropolitan Opera House; appearing alongside such legends as Burt Bacharach, Mikhail Baryshnikov, Carole Bayer Sager, Carol Burnett, Ellen Burstyn, Colleen Dewhurst, Marilyn Horne, Melissa Manchester, Bette Midler, Christopher Reeve, Brooke Shields, Lily Tomlin, and Dr. Ruth Westheimer. The chorus has continued to perform regularly in benefits for a variety of organizations and causes, including arts education funding for New York schools.

Throughout its history the NYCGMC has been committed to supporting contemporary composers. In 1985 the chorus established an annual choral competition, the first winner of which was John Burge's Songs of War. In a July 1985 review music critic Bernard Holland wrote: "The creation of homosexual singing ensembles in recent years provides more than just a sense of cultural community. Good music for concerted male voices has occupied major composers only marginally in the past, and enthusiastic performers such as the New York City Gay Men's Chorus are providing an outlet and an inspiration for new music." As of 2011 the NYCGMC has commissioned more than 100 choral works, including Conrad Susa's The Chanticleer's Carol (1981), Stuart Raleigh's Words for the Future (1985), David Conte's Invocation and Dance (1987), and Frank Ferko's Humoresques (1987).

European concert tours
In 1988 the NYCGMC became the first American gay chorus to tour Europe with performances in London, Amsterdam, Cologne, Germany and Paris. The performances were all used as benefits for the local communities to raise funds to combat the AIDS crisis in those cities. In London, the concert was hosted by Ian McKellen and featured the iconic Eartha Kitt.

The Chorus would return to Europe in 1991 to promote its third recording - Love Lives On. This tour featured performances in London, Amsterdam, Cologne, Berlin, Munich and Paris.  Again the performances raised funds for local AIDS charities. In London the host for the concert was Simon Callow. In Amsterdam the Chorus performed in a concert benefit for the Dutch National AIDS Fund. The concert, Friends For Life, featured soprano Roberta Alexandra and the Dutch National Police Band. The concert was recorded as well as televised on national television.

The Chorus toured Europe a third time in 1998, sharing the stage with the Seattle Men's Chorus. This tour covered Barcelona, Spain, Paris, Amsterdam and London. In addition to their own performance in Amsterdam, the choruses also took part in the cultural part of the Gay Games V.

In June 2014, the Chorus returned to London once more to perform with the London Gay Men's Chorus. The performance was at the Southbank Centre, Queen Elizabeth Hall. While in London, the Chorus also performed at the US Embassy at a reception hosted by US Ambassador Matthew W. Barzun. After its performance in London, the Chorus traveled to Dublin, Ireland, to take part in the European LGBT Choral Festival, Various Voices. The Chorus took part on the Festival stage and also performed at the US Embassy in Dublin. The Bord Gáis Energy Theatre was the site for a special performance of Big Gay Sing: Club Night Out as a benefit performance to raise funds for the Marriage Equality drive in Ireland. A check for €30,000 was presented to Marriage Equality in Ireland.

Music directors/Artistic directors
There have been five music directors of the Chorus in its history.
Gary Miller, 1980-1998
Barry Oliver, 1998-2001
Jeffrey Maynard, 2001-2005
Gary Miller, Casey J. Hayes, co-directors, 2005-2007
Dr. Charles Beale, 2007–2019
Gavin Thrasher, 2019-2021

Recordings
The Chorus has produced eight recordings. The first two recordings were the first ever given to a gay chorus by a major label. They were on the Pro Arte label. The third and fourth recordings were on the Virgin Classics label. The fifth, seventh and eighth were independently produced by the Chorus. The sixth recording was on the DRG label.

Festival of Song, 1984
New York, New York, 1984
Christmas Comes Anew, 1991
Love Lives On, 1991
Look to the Rainbow, 1998
Gay Century Songbook, 2000
Holiday Homecoming, 2002, recorded Live at Carnegie Hall
Classically NYCGMC, 2007, recorded at Merkin Hall

Notable guest artists
Many notable entertainers and ensembles have performed with the NYCGMC as guest artists or hosted NYCGMC concerts, including the following:

Nick Adams
Roberta Alexander
Mitchell Anderson
Jim Bailey
Kaye Ballard
Laurie Beechman
Hunter Bell
Christina Bianco
Harolyn Blackwell
Susan Blackwell
Heidi Blickenstaff
Stephen Bogardus
Justin Vivian Bond
Jeff Bowen
Betty Buckley
Charles Busch
Dean Butler
Ann Hampton Callaway
Liz Callaway
Michael Callen
Simon Callow
Carolee Carmello
David Carroll
Joyce Castle
Carol Channing
Stockard Channing 
Walter Charles
Kristin Chenoweth
Petula Clark
Victoria Clark
Judy Collins
Betty Comden
Barbara Cook
Alan Cumming
Jim David
Frenchie Davis
Shane Davis
Lea DeLaria
Loretta Devine
Colleen Dewhurst
Denny Dillon
Nancy Dussault
George Dvorsky
Daisy Eagan
Faith Esham
Tovah Feldshuh
Jesse Tyler Ferguson
Harvey Fierstein
The Flirtations
Beth Fowler
Joy Franz
Helen Gallagher
Joanna Gleason
Judy Gold
Debbie Shapiro Gravitte
Kevin Gray
Adolf Green
Amanda Green
Ellen Greene
Joel Grey
Jerry Hadley
Stephen Hanan
Ann Harada
Sam Harris
Debbie Harry
Constance Hauman
Jerry Herman
Mimi Hines
Jackie Hoffman
Marilyn Horne
George S. Irving
Jimmy James
Erika Jayne
Just Good Friends
Judy Kaye
Lainie Kazan
Larry Kert
Eartha Kitt
Nancy LaMott
Cyndi Lauper
Jenifer Lewis
Dorothy Loudon
Greg Louganis
Lorna Luft
Rebecca Luker
Heather MacRae
Karen Mason
Armistead Maupin
Andrea McArdle
Liz McCartney
Maureen McGovern
Sir Ian McKellen
John McMartin
Terrence McNally
Julia Michaels
Marilyn Michaels
Liza Minnelli
Liliane Montevecchi
Melba Moore
Rita Moreno
Kim Morgan
Julia Murney
Mystery Date
Holly Near
Bebe Neuwirth
Scott Nevins
Phyllis Newman
Marni Nixon
Kelli O'Hara
Robert Osborne
Our Lady J
Panti Bliss
Anders Paulsson
Rosie Perez
Roberta Peters
Billy Porter
Faith Prince
Sondra Radvanovsky
Ron Raines
Lee Roy Reams
Rex Reed
Ann Reinking
Caroline Rhea
Alice Ripley
Chita Rivera
Bobby Rivers
Joan Rivers
Rt. Rev. V. Gene Robinson
Jai Rodriguez
Ned Rorem
George Rose
Justin Ross
Michael Rupert
Vito Russo
Roz Ryan
Camille Saviola
Sia
Christopher Sieber
Randy Skinner
Marilyn Sokol
Stephen Sondheim
David Staller
Elly Stone
Elaine Stritch
Jo Sullivan
KT Sullivan
Terry Sweeney
Sylvia Syms
John Tartaglia
Benita Valente
Danitra Vance
Robert Verdi
Bruce Vilanch
Deborah Voigt
Frederica von Stade
Martha Wash
Elisabeth Welch
Lillias White
Terri White
Margaret Whiting
Julie Wilson
BD Wong
Rachel York
Karen Ziemba

References

External links
Official Website of the New York City Gay Men's Chorus
25th Anniversary Journal

Choirs in New York City
Gay culture in New York (state)
Gay men's choruses
Musical groups established in 1980
1980 establishments in New York City
Musical groups from New York City
LGBT organizations based in New York City
1980 in LGBT history